"Mr. Moon" is the debut single of the Swedish band Mando Diao. The single reached No. 33 on the Swedish charts. In response to a question asked by a fan on their website, the band confirmed that part of the song was about the Who's original drummer, Keith Moon.

References

2002 songs
2002 debut singles
Mando Diao songs